Sita Buzăului is a commune in Covasna County, in the geographical region of Transylvania, Romania. It is composed of four villages: Crasna (Bodzakraszna), Merișor (Almás), Sita Buzăului and Zăbrătău (Zabrató). The commune is situated in the southern part of the county, on the banks of the Buzău River.

Demographics
The commune has absolute ethnic Romanian majority. According to the 2002 census, it has a population of 4,814, of which 99.81% or 4,805 are Romanians. Other minorities are Hungarians and Germans, respectively 0.16% and 0.02% of the population.

Notes

External links
Official commune page

Communes in Covasna County
Localities in Transylvania